Loïc Lampérier (born August 7, 1989) is a professional French ice hockey player who currently plays for Dragons de Rouen of the Ligue Magnus. He participated in the 2010 IIHF World Championship as a member of the France National men's ice hockey team.

He won the Jean-Pierre Graff Trophy in 2011.

References

External links

Living people
French ice hockey forwards
Sportspeople from Rouen
1989 births
Diables Rouges de Briançon players
Rouen HE 76 players